Johannes Brahms composed his Piano Trio No. 2 in C Major, Op. 87, between 1880 and 1882. It is scored for piano, violin and cello. He wrote this piece at the age of 49.

History 
In early 1880 Brahms began working on two new piano trios, one in C major, the other in E major. By June he completed an Allegro movement for each of them, and showed them to Clara Schumann, who preferred the E major piece.  However, he set these the two movements aside while he worked on his Piano Concerto No. 2 in B flat Major, op. 83 and Symphony No. 3 in F Major, Op. 90.  He picked them up again two years later, destroying the E♭ major Allegro to concentrate on the C major piece. He completed the remaining three movements in the summer of 1882 while on vacation in the spa town of Bad Ischl, Upper Austria. The piece was the only piano trio shown to his confidants Clara Schumann and Theodor Billroth which was later published. Brahms wrote the piece later in his life: in the same period with which he composed Violin Sonata No. 1 in G Major, Op. 78,  String Quintet No.1 in F Major, Op. 88, Cello Sonata No. 2 in F Major, Op. 99, Violin Sonata No. 2 in A Major, Op. 100, Piano Trio No. 3 in C minor, Op. 101, Violin Sonata No. 3 in D minor, Op. 108, and String Quintet No. 2, Op. 111.

Analysis 
The trio is in four movements. A typical performance lasts roughly 27 to 30 minutes.

I. Allegro moderato 
The first movement is in sonata form and written in C major and 3/4 time. It is noteworthy for the extensive amount of developmental material presented in the exposition. The rhythmic pulse is frequently manipulated through obscuring bar lines and hemiolas feeling in 2 against 3. The strings often play in unison, with strong melodic and contrapuntal importance, in contrast to the piano line.

II. Andante con moto 
This movement, written in A minor and 2/4 (later 6/8 time) is a theme and variations. The original theme is followed by 5 variations, and each formal section is 27 measures long. Each variation includes a rhythmic or melodic fragment from the original theme, but is otherwise harmonized, phrased, and ornamented differently. Variations 1,3, and 5 draw from the theme's melody, while variations 2 and 4 rely more on figures of the piano's accompaniment. The movement features frequent syncopation especially in the coda, and the cello often echoes the violin in inversion. The material of the theme was originally composed: inspired by traditional Hungarian musical style.

III. Scherzo 
The third movement is a presto C minor in 6/8 time formally composed of a scherzo and trio: arranged in an ABA format. The A section is rhythmically complex while the B section is more lyrical and melodic. It features frequent pianissimo dynamics, and suggests the same mood as the third movement of Brahms' Violin Sonata No. 3 in D minor Op. 108. This movement has a lighter texture in comparison to the others. The piano mainly accompanies the strings, providing rhythmic motion. It is unclear if Brahms revised the trio section after hearing the critiques of Clara Schumann.

IV. Allegro giocoso 
The finale is in 4/4 time and the key of C major. It contains many rapid range changes as well as a denser texture than the second and third movements prior. The form is ambiguous, but includes elements of a sonata form and a rondo form. The movement is distinct for its 4 contrasting themes, which are each differently scored. The A theme is treated exclusively, while the other three themes are based on its melodic elements and or rhythmic figures. The A theme's return is highly ornamented while other repetitions are literal. The recap is followed by a long coda in which the energy intensifies until the end. The contrary motion featured in this movement was supposedly inspired by the arpeggios Brahms played in his daily warmup routine at the piano.

Reception 
The piece was premiered on December 29, 1882 by Brahms himself on piano, violinist Hugo Heerman, and Adolf Müller (Cellist of the Joachim Quartet at the time), at a chamber music museum concert in Frankfurt. The program also presented the premiere of String Quintet No. 1 in F Major, Op. 88. The audience did not like the piano trio as much the string quintet, but Clara Schumann admired it for its fluid thematic evolution and phrase structure. Early performances of the piece occurred in Berlin, London, and Vienna in January of the following year. It was published in 1883 along with Op. 88. The self-critical Brahms held this trio in high regard, writing to his publisher that they had “not yet had such a beautiful trio from me and very likely have not published its equal in the last ten years.”

References

External links

Piano trios by Johannes Brahms
1882 compositions
Compositions in C major